Frédégonde is an 1895 French opera (drame lyrique) in five acts with music by Ernest Guiraud, Camille Saint-Saëns, and Paul Dukas and a libretto by Louis Gallet based on Augustin Thierry's Récits des temps mérovingiens  (1840).

The opera was incomplete upon Guiraud's death in 1892. He had only composed the first three acts (in short score), and these were subsequently fully orchestrated by Paul Dukas. The music for the fourth and fifth acts and the ballet in the third act was composed by Saint-Saens.

Performance history
Frédégonde was premiered by the Opéra at the Palais Garnier in Paris on 18 December 1895. The set designers for Act 1 were Philippe Chaperon and his son, Émile Chaperon; Act 2, Eugène Carpezat; Act 3,  and Alexandre Bailly; and Acts 4 and 5, Amable.

The opera only received nine performances, with the last on 14 February 1896. Guiraud's music was considered foreign to his style, and, although the music by Saint-Saens was deemed better, the result was a work that was very uneven.

The first modern revival took place at the Saigon Opera House on 20 October 2017. The production was a collaboration with Grenoble's La Fabrique Opéra, whose founder, Patrick Suouillot, conducted the Ho Chi Minh City Orchestra. The six main roles were sung by French singers, including Valerie Altaver as Brunhilda, Matthieu Lécroart as Hilpérick and Richard Bousquet as Mérowig. The opera was revived in Saigon because that is where Saint-Saens completed the score, which he had brought with him when he was on a trip to Indochina.

The opera was also performed by Theater Dortmund in 2021 (a video was made) and a concert performance was given by 
Opéra de Tours in June 2022.

Roles

Recordings
Frédégonde was scheduled for revival by Theater Dortmund in May 2021 in partnership with the Palazzetto Bru Zane but cancelled due to the corona pandemic. The opera was finally performed and live streamed on 20 November 2021 with further performances.

References

External links

Operas
Operas by multiple composers
Operas by Camille Saint-Saëns
Operas by Paul Dukas
French-language operas
1895 operas
Operas based on literature
Operas completed by others